Phenaglycodol (brand names Acalmid, Acalo, Alterton, Atadiol, Felixyn, Neotran, Pausital, Remin, Sedapsin, Sinforil, Stesil, Ultran) is a drug described as a tranquilizer or sedative which has anxiolytic and anticonvulsant properties. It is related pharmacologically to meprobamate, though it is not a carbamate.

Synthesis

p-Chloroacetophenone and NaCN are reacted together to give the corresponding cyanohydrin (cf Strecker synthesis), CID:12439573. The cyano group is then hydrated in acid to the corresponding amide, p-chloroatrolactamide, CID:15255544 (4). The amide group is then further hydrolyzed with a 2nd equivalent of water in concentrated lye to p-chloroatrolactic acid, [4445-13-0] (5). Esterification to Ethyl p-chloroatrolactate [100126-96-3](6). Finally, nucleophilic addition a couple of equivalents of MeMgI are added to the ester give Phenaglycodol (7) crystals.

A mixed Pinacol coupling rxn between 4-chloroacetophenone [99-91-2] and acetone with magnesium activated with a small amount of trimethylsilyl chloride gave a 40% yield of phenglycodol.

Notes
See "Novel trifluoromethyl derivatives of substituted diols"  also.
A Pinacol rearrangement occurs in acidic water:

See also
 Metaglycodol
 Fenpentadiol

References

Anticonvulsants
Anxiolytics
Sedatives